The Hedwig von Wissmann was a German steamboat on Lake Tanganyika, which became a feature in the story behind the film The African Queen. She was sister vessel to the larger  on Lake Nyasa, and like that vessel originally used as a gunboat against slavers. Hedwig von Wissmann was the wife of the German explorer and colonial administrator Hermann von Wissmann who had raised funds for both boats.

On 12 August 1914 she was drafted for guard service on Lake Tanganyika.

German casualties were engineer and two African stokers killed in the engine room; a warrant officer and some African crew members killed and a European stoker and an African seaman slightly wounded when two of the ships boats were hit by shells. Twelve Europeans, including the captain Job Odebrecht, and eight Africans were captured by the British.

References

Steamships of Germany
1897 ships
World War I auxiliary ships of Germany
Lake Tanganyika
Maritime incidents in 1916
World War I shipwrecks
Shipwrecks of Africa